Richard Herbert Carpenter (1841–93) (often known as R. H. Carpenter) was an English architect. He was the son of Richard Cromwell Carpenter, who was also an architect, and was educated at Charterhouse School. In 1855, when he was aged 14, his father died, and the practice was taken over by William Slater, a former pupil in the practice. When Carpenter's education was complete, he joined Slater as an apprentice. He became Slater's partner in 1863 and, after Slater's death in 1872, he took his assistant, Benjamin Ingelow, into partnership. Carpenter's major works were churches in Gothic Revival style. He also restored churches, built new schools, and carried out work on domestic properties. Carpenter died in London in 1893.

The list includes the major works in which Carpenter was involved. Those carried out in collaboration with Slater are denoted by †, and those with Ingelow by ¶.

Key

Works

References

Bibliography

Carpenter, R. H.